The 193rd Special Operations Squadron (193 SOS) is a unit of the Pennsylvania Air National Guard 193rd Special Operations Wing located at Harrisburg Air National Guard Base, Middletown, Pennsylvania, The 193rd is equipped with the EC-130J Commando Solo.

Mission
Flying the EC-130J Commando Solo, a specially-modified four-engine Hercules transport, the 193rd Special Operations Squadron conducts information operations, psychological operations and civil affairs broadcasts in AM, FM, HF, TV and military communications bands. A typical mission consists of a single-ship orbit offset from the desired target audience – either military or civilian personnel. The Air Force Special Operations Command's 193rd Special Operations Wing, Middletown, Pa., has total responsibility for the Commando Solo missions.

History

World War II
Activated on 1 October 1942 at RAF Duxford, England as the 347th Fighter Squadron. Initially assigned to VIII Fighter Command, reassigned to Twelfth Air Force and engaged in combat in the North African Campaign and later based in Italy as part of the Mediterranean Theater of Operations (MTO). Engaged in combat during Sicilian and Italian Campaigns, also flew combat missions from Sardinia and in the Rhone Valley of France, 1944. Inactivated on 7 November 1945.

Pennsylvania Air National Guard
The wartime 347th Fighter Squadron was reactivated and re-designated as the 148th Fighter Squadron, and was allotted to the Pennsylvania Air National Guard, on 24 May 1946. It was organized at Reading Municipal Airport, Pennsylvania and was extended federal recognition on 27 February 1947. The 148th Fighter Squadron was entitled to the history, honors, and colors of the 347th. The squadron was equipped with F-51 Mustangs and was assigned to the 112th Fighter Group at Pittsburgh Airport as a Geographically Separated Unit (GSU).

Air Defense
The unit was called to active federal service on 1 February 1951 for duty in the Korean War. The squadron was sent to Dover AFB, Delaware where it assumed an air defense mission. The squadron was re-equipped with F-84C Thunderjets to perform air defense over the Delmarva Peninsula. It was upgraded to the dedicated F-94B Starfire interceptor by October 1951. It was released from active duty and returned to Pennsylvania commonwealth control on 1 November 1952.

Remained under ADC control after return Reading, was re-designated as a Fighter-Interceptor Squadron. Equipped with F-51D Mustangs with an air defense mission for Southeastern Pennsylvania and Philadelphia.

With the end of the line for the Mustang in USAF service, the United States Air Force, in an effort to upgrade to an all jet fighter force, required Air National Guard Air Defense Command units to upgrade to jet-powered aircraft. The Reading Airport Commission and National Guard authorities found themselves in a conflict over the use of Reading Municipal Airport for tactical jet operations. Unable to resolve these differences the Air Force inactivated the 148th Fighter-Interceptor Squadron on 30 June 1956.

Airlift
However, the National Guard Bureau's and the Commonwealth of Pennsylvania's desire to retain the unit brought a new mission and a numeric designation to the organization, the 140th Aeromedical Transport Squadron which was allotted to the Pennsylvania Air National Guard, and activated on 1 July 1956 using propeller-driven aircraft.

The 140th Aeromedical Transport Squadron was bestowed the lineage and history of the inactivated Pennsylvania ANG 148th Fighter Interceptor Squadron. The unit was re-equipped, flying the C-46 Commando and in 1958 the C-119 Flying Boxcar. In 1960, the 140th was notified that it would be converting once again to the much larger and faster C-121 Constellation. Due to runway requirements, the C-121s could not fly from Reading Airport and on 1 February 1961, the unit relocated to its current location at Olmsted Air Force Base (present day Harrisburg Air National Guard Base) due to the inadequate facilities at Reading.

On 15 October 1964, the 140th Air Transport Squadron was authorized to expand to a group level by the National Guard Bureau. However, due to a designation conflict with an existing 140th Fighter Group with the Colorado ANG, the units designation was changed to the 168th Air Transport Squadron, being assigned to the new 168th Air Transport Group as its flying squadron. Other squadrons assigned into the group were the 168th Headquarters, 168th Material Squadron (Maintenance), 168th Combat Support Squadron, and the 168th USAF Dispensary.

Special operations
Threatened by the closure of Olmsted Air Force Base and by the downsizing of all conventionally powered transport aircraft, the National Guard Bureau volunteered the unit for a psychological warfare capability named "Coronet Solo." Following the Arab-Israeli War of June 1967, psychological warfare once again became a U.S. military priority. The unit was again re-designated as the 193rd Tactical Electronic Warfare Group and transferred to Tactical Air Command (TAC). Four of its C-121s were converted to EC-121S Coronet Solos for its electronic warfare mission.

The mission later transitioned to the EC-130E (1980) and eventually to the EC-130J (2004). Soon after the 193rd SOG received EC-130s, the Air National Guard unit participated in the rescue of American citizens in Operation Urgent Fury in 1983. Then known as Volant Solo, the aircraft acted as an airborne radio station, keeping the citizens of Grenada informed about the U.S. military action. Several years later in 1989, Volant Solo was instrumental in the success of coordinated psychological operations in Operation Just Cause. During this mission it broadcast throughout the initial phases of the operation, helping to end the Noriega regime.

In the mid-1980s, along with all other USAF special operations units, it was assigned to the 23rd Air Force of the Military Airlift Command (MAC). In 1990, the 193rd joined the newly formed Air Force Special Operations Command, and the wing's aircraft were redesignated Commando Solo, with no change in mission.

In 1990–91, Commando Solo was deployed to Saudi Arabia and Turkey in support of Operations Desert Shield and DESERT STORM. Its missions included broadcasting the "Voice of the Gulf" and other highly successful programs intended to convince Iraqi soldiers to surrender. In 1994, Commando Solo was used to broadcast radio and TV messages to the citizens and leaders of Haiti during Operation Uphold Democracy. President Jean-Bertrand Aristide was featured in these broadcasts, which contributed to the orderly transition from military rule to democracy.

Continuing its tradition, in 1997 the 193 SOW and Commando Solo supported the United Nations' Operation Joint Guard with radio and TV broadcasts over Bosnia-Herzegovina in support of stabilization forces operations. In 1998, the unit and its aircraft participated in Operation Desert Thunder, a deployment to Southwest Asia to convince Iraq to comply with U.N. Security Council resolutions. The Commando Solo was again sent into action in 1999 in support of Operation Allied Force. The aircraft was tasked to broadcast radio and television into Kosovo to prevent ethnic cleansing and assist in the expulsion of the Serbs from the region. In 2001, the Commando Solo aircraft broadcast messages to the local Afghan population and Taliban soldiers during Operation Enduring Freedom.

In 2003, the Commando Solo was deployed to the Middle East in support of Operation Iraqi Freedom. Most recently, the EC-130J was redeployed to the Middle East in support of the War on Terror.

On 17 September 2022, the last broadcast with an EC-130J was made during an airshow at Lancaster Airport, Pennsylvania. The 193rd Special Operations Wing is expected to transition to the MC-130J Commando II over a period of 2 years.

Lineage
 Activated on 1 October 1942 by special authority prior to constitution as 347th Fighter Squadron on 2 October 1942.
 Inactivated on 7 November 1945.
 Re-designated 148th Fighter Squadron, and allotted to Pennsylvania ANG, on 24 May 1946
 148th Fighter Squadron extended federal recognition on 27 February 1947
 Federalized and placed on active duty, 10 February 1951
 Re-designated: 148th Fighter Squadron, 10 February 1951
 Released from active duty and returned to Pennsylvania commonwealth control, 1 November 1952
 Re-designated: 148th Fighter-Bomber Squadron on 1 November 1952
 Re-designated: 148th Fighter-Interceptor Squadron on 1 July 1955
 Inactivated on 30 June 1956
 Re-designated: 140th Aeromedical Transport Squadron and activated 1 July 1956
 Re-designated: 168th Air Transport Squadron, 16 February 1964
 Re-designated: 168th Military Airlift Squadron, 8 January 1966
 Re-designated: 193rd Tactical Electronic Warfare Squadron, 1 June 1967
 Re-designated: 193rd Electronic Combat Squadron, 6 October 1980
 Re-designated: 193rd Special Operations Squadron, 15 November 1983

Assignments
 350th Fighter Group, 1 October 1942 – 7 November 1945
 53rd Fighter Wing, 27 February 1947
 112th Fighter Group, 22 April 1949
 113th Fighter Group, 10 February 1951
 4710th Defense Wing, 6 February 1952
 112th Fighter-Bomber Group, 1 November 1952
 112th Fighter-Interceptor Group, 1 July 1955 – 30 June 1956
 Pennsylvania Air National Guard, 1 July 1956 1956 – present
 Gained by: Military Air Transport Service
 168th Air Transport Group, 16 February 1964
 168th Military Airlift Group, 8 January 1966
 193rd Tactical Electronic Warfare Group, 1 June 1967
 193rd Electronic Combat Group, 6 October 1980
 193rd Special Operations Group, 15 November 1983
 193rd Operations Group, 1 June 1995

Stations

 Bushey Hall (AAF-341), England, 1 October 1942
 RAF Snailwell (AAF-361), England, 4 October 1942
 Ground echelon, which was formed in US, was at Harding Army Air Field, La, until c. 2 November 1942
 RAF Kings Cliffe (AAF-367), England, 8 December 1942 – 4 January 1943
 Casablanca-Anfa Airport, French Morocco, 20 November 1942
 Oujda Airfield, French Morocco, 6 January 1943
 La Senia Airfield, Algeria, 12 February 1943
 Orleansville Airfield, Algeria, 9 March 1943
 Le Sers Airfield, Tunisia, 21 April 1943
 Djidjelli Airfield, Algeria, 14 May 1943
 Rerhaia Airfield, Algeria, 18 November 1943
 Corsica, c. 6 December 1943
 Detachment operated from Capodichino Airport, Naples, Italy, 10 Feb–Mar 1944

 Sardinia, 19 Ju1 1944
 Tarquinia Airfield, Italy, 15 September 1944
 Pisa Airfield, Italy, 2 December 1944 – 14 July 1945
 Seymour Johnson Field, NC, 25 Aug – 7 November 1945.
 Reading Municipal Airport, Pennsylvania, 24 May 1946 – 10 February 1951; 1 November 1952 – 30 June 1956; 1 July 1956
 Operated from Dover Air Force Base, Delaware, 10 February 1951 – 1 November 1952
 Olmstead Air Force Base, Pennsylvania, 1 February 1961
 Harrisburg International Airport, Pennsylvania, 30 June 1969
 Designated: Harrisburg Air National Guard Base, Pennsylvania, 1991 – present

Aircraft

 P-39 Airacobra, 1942–1944
 P-400 Airacobra, 1942–1943
 P-38 Lightning, 1943
 P-47 Thunderbolt, 1944–1945
 A-26 Invader, 1947–1949
 F-51 Mustang, 1949–1951; 1952–1956
 F-84C Thunderjet, 1951

 F-94C Starfire, 1951–1952
 C-46 Commando, 1956–1958
 C-119 Flying Boxcar, 1958–1961
 C-121 Constellation, 1961–1967
 EC-121 Constellation 1967–1980
 EC-130E Commando Solo 1980–2004
 EC-130J Commando Solo 2004 – present

References

 Ravenstein, Charles A. Air Force Combat Wings Lineage and Honors Histories, 1947–1977. Maxwell AFB, Alabama: Office of Air Force History, 1984. .
 A Handbook of Aerospace Defense Organization 1946–1980, by Lloyd H. Cornett and Mildred W. Johnson, Office of History, Aerospace Defense Center, Peterson Air Force Base, Colorado
 Rogers, Brian. United States Air Force Unit Designations Since 1978. Hinkley, UK: Midland Publications, 2005. .

External links
193rd Special Operations Squadron official website

Squadrons of the United States Air National Guard
Military units and formations in Pennsylvania
193
Pennsylvania Air National Guard